U.S. Patent No. 1 is a board game designed by Falko Goettsch & James Ernest, and published by Cheapass Games in 2001.

Gameplay
Each player's goal is to assemble a complete time machine (four components required), and travel back to the day the U.S. Patent Office opened so as to secure the first patent issued for their efforts.

The first actual U.S. patent was issued on July 31, 1790, to Samuel Hopkins for manufacture of potash. The game's cover art states that "But if you have a time machine, it doesn't really matter who invented it first. All that matters is who gets to the Patent Office first." However, prior to the 2011 America Invents Act, the United States was the sole country with a "first to invent" rule. Unfortunately, proving prior conception when time travel is involved may present difficulties to the inventor.

Reception
The game was nominated for the Origins Award for Best Science Fiction or Fantasy Board Game of 2001, but lost to Risk 2210.

Publication history
Cheapass Games no longer supports the game, but has made the complete game available for free download on their "Boulevard of Broken Games" page.

Reviews
Pyramid

References

External links
 U.S. Patent No. 1 at Cheapass Games
 U.S. Patent No. 1 at BoardGameGeek

Board games introduced in 2001
Cheapass Games games
Board games with a modular board